Sioux Valley High School is a high school located in Volga, South Dakota, United States.

History
The Sioux Valley High School was consolidated in 1960. Three towns, Bruce, Sinai and Volga, consolidated and became the Sioux Valley School District. At one time there was talk of a master school district that would involve the towns of Bruce, White and Brookings.

Campus
The school facilities can accommodate up to 600 students.

Extracurricular activities

Athletics
All of the school's sports are in the class A division except for American football which is in class 11B and golf and wrestling which are in class B. The school mascot is the Cossack.

The following is a list of athletic teams:
Cross country
American Football
Volleyball
Girls' basketball
Boys' basketball
Wrestling
Track
Golf
Competitive cheer

References

External links

Public high schools in South Dakota
Educational institutions established in 1882
Schools in Brookings County, South Dakota
1882 establishments in Dakota Territory